Fred Rouse  may refer to:

Fred Rouse (born December 17, 1985) is a former professional gridiron football wide receiver
Fred Rouse (1881 – 1953) was an English professional footballer
Fred Rouse 1921 Lynching victim